The 36th Air Assault Brigade is an air assault brigade of the Kazakh Air Assault Forces. It is based in Astana.

History 
In 2002, the brigade was formed in Astana from the 46th Special Purpose Detachment. At the time, it only consisted of the 260th Air Assault Battalion, an artillery battalion and reconnaissance units. From  2011, the brigade was commanded by Major General Almaz Dzhumakeev (appointed commander of Kazakh Airmobile Forces in 2015). It tested Russian-made Irkut-3 UAVs in early 2013. On 24 May 2013, it was inspected by OSCE experts in accordance with the Vienna Document. In April 2013, the brigade was equipped with Otokar Cobra armored fighting vehicles. On 29 May 2015, it was inspected by OSCE experts in accordance with the Vienna Document. Since 2002, the brigade has controlled the Honor Guard Company of the Ministry of Defense of Kazakhstan. It was recognized as the best formation of the Armed Forces by the end of last 2019. In June 2020, fifty-five military personnel from the brigade under Lieutenant Colonel Ulan Nurgaziyev took part in the Moscow Victory Day Parade on Red Square.

References 

Military units and formations of Kazakhstan
Airborne infantry brigades
Military units and formations established in 2002